iRacing is a subscription-based online racing simulation video game developed and published by iRacing.com Motorsport Simulations in 2008. All in-game sessions are hosted on the publisher's servers. The game simulates real world cars, tracks, and racing events, and enforces rules of conduct modeled on real auto racing events.

Gameplay
iRacing primarily focuses on creating an environment in game that will mimic real-life driving close as possible, including the use of LIDAR-scanned cars and tracks.
Without special settings either set in a custom session or by administrators, players are confined to a cockpit-only view when driving, in contrast to other popular sim racing games like Gran Turismo or Assetto Corsa. 

iRacing offers a day-night-cycle, offering more dynamic racing due to temperature variation and limited sight at night.

It provides support for racing wheels and gamepads alike, but it is generally recommended to use a racing wheel, support for adaptive controls used by players with physical challenges is also included. iRacing also supports the use of VR headsets.

iRacing.com released AI capable driving in late 2019, which continues to see more tracks and cars added to AI capability as the releases of the game go on.

Online play

Racing series and seasons 
iRacing.com sanctions many different race series on its service, some of which are meant to correspond to race series held in real life. There are four disciplines of auto racing available for players: road, oval, dirt road (composed of rallycross and trophy truck racing), and dirt oval. Each series has three session types for the given week: Open practice, Qualifying, or Time Trial. Each series has its own seasonal championship for Race and Time Trial, and also a separate, non-series based Time Attack mode. Users are allowed to create their own race or practice sessions and their own full series and seasons using iRacings Hosted Sessions and Leagues features, respectively.

 License classes 

After the "Rookie" license, which all players start at, iRacing uses a letter-grade licensing system, with grades of D, C, B, and A, from lowest to highest. There is also a Pro license, which is reserved for drivers who qualify for the premier eSports series hosted by iRacing.com, such as the eNASCAR iRacing Series and the Porsche eSports Supercup. 

Advancement of a license class is determined by a player's participation in sessions that have a minimum required license that isn't lower than the player's current license (called a Minimum Participation Requirement), and advancement of safety rating. 

 Safety rating system 

The safety rating system in iRacing is a rudimentary, no-blame system for determining how "safe" a player is on the track by penalizing a player for "incident points" by deducting from their safety rating. Examples of things that would incur incident points would be going off the track, losing control of the car, and contact with an object (usually a barrier or wall) or another car. Players can be penalized in-game or disqualified from a session for incurring too many incident points.

 Driver rating system 

iRacing also includes an ELO-type driver skill rating system called iRating, used to split drivers into different race sessions and championship divisions for better competition. iRating and safety rating are only impacted in iRacing.com-sanctioned official races.

Content
While the access to 16 cars and 22 tracks are provided in the subscription's base content, users must purchase individual licenses for each additional vehicle and track that they wish to drive. All of the content included in the subscription is enough to get the player out of the Rookie license class in every discipline.  The track and vehicle catalogue in iRacing is subject to additions of new content with each season update. Currently, according to iRacing.com themselves, their catalogue consists of more than 100 cars and tracks. Cars on the service include stock cars, sprint cars, touring cars, open-wheel cars, and prototype cars.

Development
iRacing began to be developed in 2004, when Dave Kaemmer, co-founder of the Papyrus Design Group, partnered with John W. Henry to create FIRST.net LLC, which then acquired the code to NASCAR Racing 2003 Season. Kaemmer then worked this source code into what would become iRacing, released four years later in 2008. iRacing retains the multi-body physics system of NR2003, as well as some of the track presentation and multi-user packet code, but everything else has been changed, or is completely new, like the tire model and graphics engine. The service receives regular updates between 12-week competition seasons.

Over a two-month period in December 2021 and January 2022, iRacing.com acquired a pair of racing game companies, Orontes Games and Monster Games; the former developed the Oorntes game engine used in its 2020 off-road racing game Drag, while the latter has created multiple racing games including NASCAR Heat. The two remained independent from their new parent, though iRacing's development team absorbed assets like Orontes' lead developers Christian Folkers and Thorsten Folkers and Monster's owner Rich Garcia.

 Partnerships 

 NASCAR 
iRacing.com has been a long time partner of NASCAR. Their first partnership was announced in 2010, renewed once, and is now looking forward at a decade or more of future partnership, announced in a further renewal agreement in 2021. 
On November 2nd, 2020 NASCAR Hall of Fame member Dale Earnhardt Jr. was named as executive director at iRacing.com. NASCAR is involved in several series present on iRacing, including the premier eNASCAR Coca-Cola iRacing Series and its respective, iRacing.com-sanctioned series: the NASCAR iRacing Series classes A B and C, and the eNASCAR Road to Pro Qualifying Series.

 IMSA 
IMSA first partnered with iRacing.com in 2020 with the debut of the IMSA iRacing Pro Series, which put professional racing drivers from IMSA and other series against each other in the iRacing simulation software. IMSA also sponsors several iRacing.com-sanctioned series designed to reflect real series that IMSA holds: the IMSA Hagerty iRacing Series, iRacing IMSA Michelin Pilot Challenge, and the IMSA iRacing Endurance Series.

 World of Outlaws 
World of Outlaws began partnering with iRacing.com in 2018 to provide two eSports World Championship Series, one for late models, the other for sprint cars. On April 5th, 2022, along with the announcement of the extension of their partnership, WoO announced they would be developing a new World of Outlaws console game with iRacing.com and Monster Games, the first new World of Outlaws game in more than 10 years.

 Porsche 
German automobile manufacturer Porsche has worked together with iRacing.com since 2017, announcing the first iteration of the Porsche eSports Supercup in 2018. iRacing.com has many of Porsche's vehicles in its catalogue due to the connection between the two.

 FOX Sports 
In March 2020, FOX Sports aired the inaugural event of the eNASCAR iRacing Pro Invitational Series, due to real-life auto racing events being hindered due to the  COVID-19 pandemic. This endeavour proved to be successful, with the broadcast on FS1 watched by almost a million viewers. FOX subsequently decided to air the rest of the series would continue to be broadcast on FS1. The series continued until 2021, when drivers returned to normal driving at real-life events.

 Other partnerships 

iRacing.com has many other partnerships with other racing organisations like USAC and IndyCar, and licensing deals with major automotive manufacturers like Audi and Mercedes. A full list of iRacing.com's partners can be found on their website.

Reception

iRacing was launched to the public on August 26, 2008. By July 2009 more than 16,000 individuals had subscribed to the service. The company said there were 50,000 members as of December 2013.  By April of 2020, iRacing.com president and CFO Anthony Gardner claimed the service had over 160,000 active subscribers. 

iRacing has received favorable reviews from automobile, racing and gaming magazines as well as websites dedicated to racing simulators. The service has also been criticized for not yet including features often found on other racing simulators, such as rain and more advanced visual damage modeling. PC Gamer stated that the game was "not one that will be to everyone's taste", while GameStar back in 2009 concluded "The graphics give the impression of an unfinished beta, but at least the atmosphere between the players is always friendly."

References

Further reading
 Cole, Shaun & Gangi, Darin. (April 15, 2008). iRacing interview with Scott Mckee (Flash video). Inside Sim Racing. Retrieved on 15 February 2017.
 Autosimsport 4' (2): 8–9, 19–30, April 15, 2008.

External links
 

2008 video games
Racing simulators
Racing video games
Video games developed in the United States
Oculus Rift games
Windows games
Windows-only games